Sheikh Nasser bin Hamad Al Khalifa (born 8 May 1987) is a member of the Bahraini royal family, Commander of Bahrain's Royal Guard, deputy chairman of the Higher Committee for Energy and Natural Resources and the head of the government's Supreme Council for Youth and Sports. He is the third in line of the heir apparent of the Kingdom of Bahrain. In April 2021, he was appointed as chairman of Nogaholding.

Early life and education
Al Khalifa is the fourth-born son of the King of Bahrain, Hamad bin Isa Al Khalifa with Sheia bint Hassan Al Khrayyesh Al Ajmi, his second wife.
He was educated in Bahrain at Ibn Khuldoon National School. He then joined the commissioning course of officer cadet at the Sandhurst Military Academy in the United Kingdom (2005-2006), where he was the recipient of King Hussain’s Medal for Outstanding Overseas Cadet and achieved Second Lieutenants Rank. H.H. Shaikh Nasser also participated in numerous military training courses, programs and exercises that contributed to his leadership advancement. He also attended the U.S Marine Corps Command and Staff College; Quantico VA, USA (2010-2011). He is currently serving in the Bahrain Defence Force and leads the Bahrain National Endurance Team.

Military service
Sh. Nasser Bin Hamad started his career as a platoon commander in the Motorized Infantry Company of the Royal Guard Battalion. After that he went on to become the Rapid reaction force commander in the Royal Guard, where he served from 2008 - 2011, and is currently the commander of the Bahrain Defence Force Royal Guard since he was appointed in 2011. As Commander of the Royal Guard, he overseed the operations and strategic planning of the Royal Guards’ functions and regiments – joint-country or domestic – and monitored its growth and development. As part of these development initiatives, he established an elite contingent, the Special Quick Reaction Force, within the Royal Guard. He participated in the Saudi led Operations Decisive Storm and Restoring Hope by commanding the first Royal Guard Task Force in 2015 which conducted operations in both Ma’rib and Aden.

In July 2020, his father King Hamad bin Isa Al Khalifa appointed him as Secretary General of the Supreme Defence Council. As the National Security Advisor and General Secretary of the Supreme Council for Defence, he manages royal directives, charged by His Majesty the King on matters pertaining to national security, regional relations and youth and leads high level delegations globally, to cover various grounds that concern the Kingdom of Bahrain’s role as an active player in the global arena.

Endurance racing and athletics
In December 2006, Al Khalifa led the Bahrain National Endurance team in the Doha Asian Games. He won a silver medal in the individual race and the six-member Bahraini squad came second in the overall team event.

In September 2007, Al Khalifa led the Bahrain National Endurance team in the European Open held at Portugal. He came in 8th place in the individual race and the Bahrain team came in second place and won a silver medal.

In October 2018, Al Khalifa competed at the 2018 Ironman World Championship and completed the race in 57th place of his category that was held in Kailua-Kona, Hawaii.

In July 2022, Al Khalifa riding his horse Lola de Jalima, captained the Royal Endurance Team that won the 120-kilometre race and the 160-kilometre race, clocking 5 hours, 48 minutes and 59 seconds in Slovakia.

In October 2022, Al Khalifa won gold at the FEI Endurance World Championship for Young Horses riding the mare Lola de Jalima in Vic, Spain.

Deputy Chairman of the Higher Committee for Energy and Natural Resources 
Al Khalifa was appointed in 2021 as the deputy chairman of the higher committee for energy and natural resources. The Supreme Committee for Energy and Natural Resource's responsibility is to review the national energy strategy of the Kingdom of Bahrain. The committee is also responsible for setting the strategy of the current oil expansion project in Bahrain including the Bapco Modernization Programme (BMP). He became the chairman of (Nogaholding) where the countries energy industry is transitioning towards sustainable energy production. Under his leadership, (Nogaholding) has begun to set various plans to maximize value creation, search for optimize solutions while tapping into alternative energy sources to ensure the company’s goals are in line to meet the Kingdom’s energy requirements and global competition.

Charity
He furthermore chairs the Board of Trustees of the Royal Charity Organization and contributes to the design of the organization’s strategy and development. As part of Bahrain’s humanitarian initiatives, Major General. Shaikh Nasser Al Khalifa paid a visit to the Al Zatari Refugee Camp in Jordan to preview the matters of the Syrian refugees and inaugurated the Bahrain School for Syrian refugees at the Al Zatari Refugee Camp in Jordan on November 25, 2012. In addition, he signed an agreement in the Philippines in February 2014, following the devastating typhoon, to build two vocational training centers carrying the name of "Bahrain", and a 500-home residential complex.

Personal life
Al Khalifa married in Dubai on 28 September 2009 (nikah ceremony) and 2 October 2009 (milcha reception) to Shaikha bint Mohammed bin Rashid Al Maktoum, a daughter of the Emir of Dubai, Mohammed bin Rashid Al Maktoum. They have one daughter and four sons.

Leadership titles

 Royal Endurance Team Leader (2000).
 Honorary Chairman of Bahraini Committee for Endurance (2000).
 President of the Bahrain Royal Equestrian & Endurance Federation (2003-2009).
 Chairman of the Board of Trustees of the Royal Charity Organization (2007).
 Member of the Economic Development Board (2008).
 Chairman of The Bahrain Olympic Committee (2009 – 2021).
 First Deputy President of the Supreme Council for Youth & Sports (2010). 
 President of the Supreme Council for Youth & Sports (2010).
 Commander of the Royal Guard (2011). 
 Personal Representative of His Majesty the King for Philanthropy and Youth Affairs (2014).
 Chairman of the board of Trustees of the Nasser Bin Hamad Foundation (2014). 
 President of the Higher Commission for Financial Coordination and Cooperation (2016).
 Deputy President of the Supreme Authority of the Royal Fund for Martyrs of Duty (2016).
 Chairman of High Committee, Bahrain International Defence Exhibition and Conference (2017).
 Member of Supreme Council for Defence (2017).
 Honorary President of the Bahrain Royal Equestrian & Endurance Federation (2019).
 National Security Advisor (2019).
 Deputy Chairman of the Higher Committee for Energy and Natural Resources (2020).
 General Secretary of the Supreme Council for Defence (2020).
 Deputy Chairman of the Higher Committee for Energy and Natural Resources (2021).
 Chairman of the Board of Directors of the Oil and Gas Holding Company (Nogaholding) (2021).

Honours and awards
Knight Grand Cross of the Order of Merit of the Italian Republic (17 October 1996).
The Arab Knight of Giving Award  by the 4th Arab Giving Forum - Zayed Giving Initiative in the United Arab of Emirates (24 April 2016). 
The Medal of Honour by the Palestinian President, Mr. Mahmoud Abbas (11 July 2016). 
The ANOC Medal in appreciation of his major role in sports at the international level (15 November 2016). 
The Distinction Award for the "Best Arab rider", following third-place finish in the World Endurance Championship in Slovakia, September 17, 2016, from the FEI Regional Group VII (FEI Group VII) of the Federation Equestre International (FEI). (2016) 
Honorary Leadership Personality Of The Year Award Kingdom of Bahrain. (2020)

Allegations of torture
Al Khalifa became the subject of allegations of torture after anti-government protests in 2011. In 2014, a Bahraini citizen sought the arrest of Al Khalifa in the United Kingdom following allegations that he was directly involved in the torture of three prisoners in Bahrain during a pro-democracy uprising there in 2011. In a statement, the Bahraini government denied the accusations and called them "politically motivated", however it also recognized its responsibility to investigate any reasonable allegation.
Several  criticized his participation at the 2014 FEI World Equestrian Games in Normandy, France. The high court in London ruled that Al Khalifa is not immune from torture claims. In 2017, activists asked the United States to suspend a diplomatic visa for Al Khalifa over the allegations.

Ancestry

References 

1987 births
Living people
Nasser
Graduates of the Royal Military Academy Sandhurst
Asian Games medalists in equestrian
Equestrians at the 2006 Asian Games
Knights Grand Cross of the Order of Merit of the Italian Republic
Asian Games silver medalists for Bahrain
Medalists at the 2006 Asian Games
Sons of kings